Hošnica is a settlement in the Municipality of Slovenska Bistrica in northeastern Slovenia. It is part of the traditional region of Styria and is now included with the rest of the municipality in the Drava Statistical Region.

References

External links
Hošnica at Geopedia

Populated places in the Municipality of Slovenska Bistrica
http://www.geopedia.si/Geopedia_en.html?params=L5567_F10132967_T973_vF_b4_x545839_y132244_s15#T973_L5567_x546197.5_y132234.5_s15_b4_vF